Daphne kiusiana is a shrub, of the family Thymelaeaceae.  It is native to China, specifically areas including Anhui, Fujian, and Guangdong. A variation of this plant, var. kiusiana, is also found in Japan and South Korea.

Description
The shrub is evergreen, and grows from 0.5 to 2.0 meters tall. Its branches are dark purplish red or brown.  It is often found in forests and moist places at an altitude of 300 to 400 meters.

References

kiusiana